11-22-63 may refer to:

 Assassination of John F. Kennedy, which occurred on Friday, November 22, 1963
 11/22/63, a 2011 time-travel novel by Stephen King
 11.22.63, a 2016 Hulu TV series based on the Stephen King novel
 November 22, 1963, see November 1963#November 22, 1963 (Friday)

See also
 November 22
 November 1963